Hautapu is a township in the Waipa District and Waikato region of New Zealand's North Island, located just north of Cambridge across State Highway 1.

The area was identified as the Hautapu Parish on a militia farm map published in 1864 during the Waikato War, named after the Hautapu Rapids which previously occupied the site of the current Karapiro Power Station. The Hautapu Cemetery was established in June 1866.

A Fonterra dairy factory is a key feature of the township. The factory was proposed in August 1884 and began processing milk on 20 December 1884 as the Cambridge Produce and Dairy Factory. In 1886, the factory was sold to new owners and was expanded to produce butter, cheese and bacon after running into problems with milk supplies. In 1901, it was sold to a new dairy co-operative which replaced the factory with a new brick factory in 1908. The factory began specialising in cheese in 1915, and came under the ownership of the new national dairy co-operative in 1919.

Jas Taylor was one of the first and most significant early settlers; several others followed as the area became more densely populated between the 1910s and 1930s. This trend then reversed, as smaller farms consolidated into larger farms.

A  industrial plant is being developed at Hautapu between 2019 and 2024, which is expected to employ 1150 jobs once completed. Most of these jobs will be at a new 44m² ALP aluminium factory being constructed to replace a 1970s plant in Te Rapa, once of the largest factories ever built in New Zealand.

The township has its own rugby, netball and hockey club. The rugby club plays in a local tournament with other local town clubs.

There is a Returned and Services' Association memorial in the town, listing people from Cambridge killed during the Boer War, World War I and World War II. Ten World War I casualties and two World War II casualties are buried at the local cemetery.

Demographics

Hautapu had a population of 1,173 at the 2018 New Zealand census, a decrease of 33 people (−2.7%) since the 2013 census, and an increase of 183 people (18.5%) since the 2006 census. There were 423 households, comprising 582 males and 594 females, giving a sex ratio of 0.98 males per female, with 216 people (18.4%) aged under 15 years, 243 (20.7%) aged 15 to 29, 564 (48.1%) aged 30 to 64, and 153 (13.0%) aged 65 or older.

Ethnicities were 92.6% European/Pākehā, 8.7% Māori, 2.6% Pacific peoples, 4.3% Asian, and 1.0% other ethnicities. People may identify with more than one ethnicity.

The percentage of people born overseas was 19.9, compared with 27.1% nationally.

Although some people chose not to answer the census's question about religious affiliation, 58.3% had no religion, 34.3% were Christian, 0.3% were Hindu, 0.5% were Buddhist and 0.5% had other religions.

Of those at least 15 years old, 201 (21.0%) people had a bachelor's or higher degree, and 144 (15.0%) people had no formal qualifications. 207 people (21.6%) earned over $70,000 compared to 17.2% nationally. The employment status of those at least 15 was that 543 (56.7%) people were employed full-time, 174 (18.2%) were part-time, and 30 (3.1%) were unemployed.

Hautapu statistical area is within the Cambridge urban area and Hautapu Rural is outside it.

Education

The school board was established in January 1876 and teacher Rev McLaurin began classes in March 1877. The school was relocated in 1884, and new school was built at another more central site in 1910. The school was enlarged again three times between 1918 and 1953.

See also
:Category:Burials at Hautapu Cemetery

References

Waipa District
Cambridge, New Zealand
Populated places in Waikato